The Misión Jesuita Mapuche is a modern Jesuit mission based in Tirúa, Arauco Province, Chile. The mission serves indigenous Mapuche communities and local non-Mapuche Catholics alike. Jesuit Carlos Bresciani is the leader of the mission. According to Bresciani the mission is not aimed to proselytize, saying "were are not [here] to make more Catholics".

See also
 List of Jesuit sites

External links
Misión Jesuita Mapuche blog

References

Biobío Region
Catholic Church in Chile
Jesuit missions
Mapuche